The 1995 IBF World Championships (World Badminton Championships) were held in Lausanne, Switzerland, between 22 May and 28 May 1995.

Venue
Malley Sports Centre

Medalists

Medal table

Events

External links
BWF Results

 
BWF World Championships
World Championships
Badminton
Badminton
Sport in Lausanne
Badminton tournaments in Switzerland